Sport Clube Valenciano is a Portuguese sports club from Valença do Minho.

The men's football team plays in the Ap. Campeão da AF Viana. The team played on the third-tier 1997–98 Segunda Divisão B and 2004–05 Segunda Divisão B, being relegated both times. The team was later relegated further from the 2010–11 Terceira Divisão. Another one-off season on the new third tier 2013–14 Campeonato Nacional de Seniores followed.

In the Taça de Portugal, Valenciano notably reached the third round in 2018–19.

References

Football clubs in Portugal
Association football clubs established in 1924
1924 establishments in Portugal